The genus Milaculum was erected to contain isolated plates that have since been identified as components of palaeoscolecid worms.  They are adorned with regularly arranged humps that recall the arrangement of holes in Microdictyon.  The plates are sometimes found in association with palaeoscolecid cuticle.

References

Prehistoric protostome genera
Paleoscolecids
Paleozoic life of Nunavut